Zweikanalton ("two-channel sound") or A2 Stereo, is an analog television sound transmission system used in Germany, Austria, Australia, Switzerland, Netherlands and some other countries that use or used PAL-B or PAL-G. TV3 Malaysia formerly used Zweikanalton on its UHF analogue transmission frequency (Channel 29), while NICAM was instead used on its VHF analogue transmission frequency (Channel 12). South Korea also formerly utilised a modified version of Zweikanalton for its NTSC analogue television system until 31 December 2012. It relies on two separate FM carriers.

This offers a relatively high separation between the channels (compared to a subcarrier-based multiplexing system) and can thus be used for bilingual broadcasts as well as stereo. Unlike the competing NICAM standard, Zweikanalton is an analog system.

How it works 
A 2nd FM sound carrier containing the right channel for stereo is transmitted at a frequency 242 kHz higher than the existing mono FM sound carrier, and channel mixing is used in the receiver to derive the left channel.

The second sound carrier also contains a 54.6875 kHz pilot tone to indicate whether the transmission is stereo or bilingual.

The pilot tone is 50% amplitude-modulated with 117.5 Hz for stereo or 274.1 Hz for bilingual.

a.The second sound carrier frequency of DK systems varies from country, and sometimes manufacturers divide them into DK1/DK2/DK3 systems.
b.The video bandwidth is reduced.

Zweikanalton can be adapted to any existing analogue television system, and modern PAL or SECAM television receivers generally include a sound detector IC that can decode both Zweikanalton and NICAM.

Zweikanalton can carry either a completely separate audio program, or can be used for stereo sound transmission. In the latter case, the first FM carrier carries (L+R) for compatibility, while the second carrier carries R (not L-R.) After combining the two channels, this method improves the signal-to-noise ratio by reducing the correlated noise between the channels.

The frequencies are chosen such that they cause minimal interference to the picture. The difference between the two sound carriers is 15.5 times the line frequency (15.5 x 15625 Hz = 242187.5 Hz) which, being an odd multiple of half line frequency, reduces the visibility of intermodulation products between the two carriers. The pilot tone frequency is 3.5 times line frequency (54687.5 Hz). The modulated tone frequency is 117.50 Hz for stereo transmission and 274.1 Hz for bilingual transmission. Absence of this tone is interpreted as a monaural transmission.

System M variant 
There is a modified version of Zweikanalton used in South Korea, compatible with the NTSC System M standard of TV transmission. In this case the second FM carrier is 14.25 times the line frequency, or about 224 kHz, above the first carrier; pre-emphasis is 75 microseconds; the stereo pilot tone frequency is 149.9 Hz; the bilingual pilot tone frequency is 276 Hz; and the second channel carries L-R (not R).

History 
Zweikanalton was developed by the Institut für Rundfunktechnik (IRT) in Munich during the 1970s, and was first introduced on the German national television channel ZDF on 13 September 1981. The German public broadcaster ARD subsequently introduced Zweikanalton on its Das Erste channel on 29 August 1985 in honour of the 1985 edition of the Internationale Funkausstellung Berlin (IFA). The (then)-West Germany thus became the first country in Europe to use multiplexed sound on its television channels. 

As a result of the analogue television switch-off in most countries which used Zweikanalton during 2006–2019, Zweikanalton is now considered obsolete and has been replaced with MPEG-2 and/or MPEG-4 for countries that have converted to DVB-T/DVB-T2 (Germany, Austria, Australia, Switzerland, Netherlands, Malaysia), and Dolby Digital AC-3 for countries that have converted to ATSC (South Korea).

Other names 
Zweikanalton is known by a variety of names worldwide. Most commonly used names are Zweiton, German Stereo, A2 Stereo, West German Stereo and IGR Stereo.

See also 
Multichannel television sound (3 additional audio channels in an NTSC-format audio carrier.)
NICAM
EIAJ MTS

Notes and references

Broadcast engineering
Television technology